International Pharmaceutical Excipients Council is a global organization founded in 1991 representing producers, suppliers, and end users of excipients. The body has three divisions in Europe, Japan, and the United States, each of which focuses on local regulations concerning the excipients market, as well as on new research and business practices.

See also 
 IFPMA

References

External links 
 IPEC Foundation
 IPEC-Americas
 IPEC Japan
 IPEC Europe

Pharmaceutical industry trade groups
International medical and health organizations
 IPEC-INDIA